David Avrom Bell is an American historian specializing in French history.

Biography

David Bell was born into a Jewish family in New York City in 1961. He is the son of sociologist Daniel Bell and literary critic Pearl Kazin Bell  (Alfred Kazin's sister).

He completed his A.B. in History and Literature at Harvard University in 1983, magna cum laude and Phi Beta Kappa. He completed his M.A. in History in 1987 and his Ph.D. in 1991, both at Princeton University. He then taught at Yale University from 1990 to 1996; Johns Hopkins University from 1996 to 2010, where he was Dean of Faculty beginning in 2007; and at Princeton University since 2010.

Contributions to Scholarship

Books
 Men on Horseback: The Power of Charisma in the Age of Revolution (Farrar, Straus and Giroux, 2020)
 The West: A New History (W. W. Norton, 2018)
 Shadows of Revolution: Reflections on France, Past and Present (Oxford University Press, 2016).
 Napoleon: A Concise Biography (Oxford University Press, 2015).
 The First Total War: Napoleon's Europe and the Birth of War As We Know It (Houghton Mifflin, 2007).
 The Cult of the Nation in France: Inventing Nationalism, 1680-1800 (Harvard University Press, 2001).
 Lawyers and Citizens: The Making of a Political Elite in Old Regime France (Oxford University Press, 1994).

Awards
 Louis Gottschalk Prize, American Society for Eighteenth-Century Studies (2008) for his book The First Total War: Napoleon's Europe and the Birth of War As We Know It
 Finalist, Los Angeles Times History Book Prize (2008) for his book The First Total War: Napoleon's Europe and the Birth of War As We Know It
 John Simon Guggenheim Memorial Foundation Fellowship (2004)
 Leo Gershoy Award of the American Historical Association for his book The Cult of the Nation in France: Inventing Nationalism, 1680-1800 (2002)
 Woodrow Wilson International Center for Scholars (1998)

References

External links
 

Historians of France
Writers from New York City
1961 births
Living people
Jewish historians
Princeton University alumni
Princeton University faculty
Yale University faculty
Johns Hopkins University faculty
The New Republic people
Harvard College alumni
21st-century American historians
21st-century American male writers
Historians from New York (state)
American male non-fiction writers